The Diocese of Pelplin is a Latin Church ecclesiastical territory or diocese located in the city of Pelplin, Poland. It is a suffragan diocese in the ecclesiastical province of metropolitan Archdiocese of Gdańsk.

History
 1243: Established as part of Roman Catholic Diocese of Chełmno
 March 25, 1992: Roman Catholic Diocese of Chełmno split into the Diocese of Pelplin and The Diocese of Toruń

Special churches
Minor Basilicas:
 Bazylika Ścięcia Świętego Jana Chrzciciela (Basilica of the Beheading of St. John Baptist), Chojnice

Leadership
 Bishops of Pelplin
 Bishop Ryszard Kasyna (since 2012.12.08)
 Bishop Jan Bernard Szlaga (1992.03.25 – 2012.04.25)
 Bishops of Chelmno
 Archbishop Marian Przykucki (1981.06.15 – 1992.03.25)
 Bishop Bernard Czapliński (1973.03.16 – 1980.12.30)
 Bishop Kazimierz Jósef Kowalski (1946.03.04 – 1972.05.06)
 Bishop Carl Maria Splett (Apostolic Administrator 1940.12.05 – 1946.03.04)
 Bishop Stanislao Okoniewski (1926.10.04 – 1944)
 Bishop Augustinus Rosentreter (1898.12.22 – 1926.10.04)
 Bishop Leo Redner (1886.11.16 – 1898.04.01)
 Bishop Johannes von der Marwitz (1857.01.14 – 1886.03.29)
 Bishop Anastasius Johannes Sedlag (1833.07.28 – 1856.09.23)
 Bishop Ignatius Vincentius Matthy (1823.11.17 – 1832.05.20)
 Bishop Franciszek Ksawery Graf Rydzyński (1795.10.10 – 1814.10.16)
 Bishop Johann Karl Reichsgraf von Hohenzollern-Hechingen (1785.01.31 – 1795.12.18)
 Bishop Antoni Onufry Okecki (1771.03.04 – 1775.05.29)
 Bishop Andrzej Ignacy Baier (1758.11.18 – 1785.01.31)
 Bishop Wojciech Stanisław Leski, O. Cist. (1746.10.17 – 1758.09.19)
 Bishop Andrzej Stanisław Załuski (1739.03.08 – 1746.05.02)
 Bishop Adam Stanisław Grabowski (1736.09.26 – 1739.07.15)
 Bishop Józef Eustachy Szembek (1736 – 1753)
 Bishop Thomaz Franciszek Czapski, O. Cist. (1730.12.06 – 1733.04.23)
 Bishop Feliks Ignacy Kretowski (1722.11.20 – 1730.12.06)
 Bishop Jan Kazimierz de Alten Bokum (1718.06.27 – 1721.06.30)
 Archbishop Teodor Andrzej Potocki (1699.04.11 – 1712.06.10)
 Bishop Kazimierz Szczuka (1693.10.02 – 1694.06.30)
 Bishop Jan Kazimierz Opaliński, O. Cist. (1681.06.23 – 1693.07.22)
 Bishop Jan Małachowski (1676.06.22 – 1681.05.12)
 Archbishop Andrzej Olszowski (1661.02.23 – 1674.10.01)
 Bishop Adam Kos (1657.11.11 – 1661.02.11)
 Bishop Jan Gembicki (1653.04.21 – 1655.05.11)
 Archbishop Andrzej Leszczyński (1646.05.04 – 1653.01.08)
 Archbishop Jan Lipski (1636 – 1639)
 Archbishop Wawrzyniec Gembicki (1600 – 1610)
 Cardinal Stanisław Hosius (1549.07.12 – 1551.05.11)

See also
Catholic Church in Poland
Konstantyn Dominik

Sources
 GCatholic.org
 Catholic Hierarchy
  Diocese website
 Servant of God, Bishop Konstantyn Dominik

Roman Catholic dioceses in Poland
Religious organizations established in the 1240s
1240s establishments in Europe